Lapland is an album by Craig Wedren. It was released on October 25, 2005, via Team Love Records.

It was the fourth release from Team Love Records.

Critical reception
Orlando Weekly called the album "reflective singer/songwriter pop." AllMusic considered it "a set of crafty, inviting pop that's also musically curious and quite personal."

Track listing
 "Kingdom" - 3:21
 "Night is Over" - 3:05
 "Do You Harm" - 2:55
 "Wanna Drive?" - 3:12
 "Alone in Love" - 2:35
 "Fifteen Minutes Late" - 3:43
 "Rain Diamonds" - 3:05
 "Born Curious" - 2:46
 "Stuck" - 2:57
 "She Don't Sleep" - 3:45
 "Love Among Ruins" - 3:35
 "One Man's Heart" - 5:09
 "Laughing Liddy" - 0:57

References

External links
Craig Wedren official website
Team Love Records

2005 albums
Craig Wedren albums
Team Love Records albums